Scott Miller Gibson (born April 28, 1957) is an American pastor, theologian, and educator who currently serves as a professor of preaching, is the holder of the David E. Garland Chair in preaching, and is director of the Ph.D. in Preaching Program at Baylor University’s George W. Truett Theological Seminary. He was previously the Haddon W. Robinson Professor of Preaching at Gordon-Conwell Theological Seminary (1991-2018). Gibson is an author, lecturer, preacher, and conference speaker specializing in homiletics.

Early life and education 
Gibson was born on April 28, 1957 in New Castle, Pennsylvania, to Bob and Jean Gibson.

He attended Pennsylvania State University, where he earned a bachelor's degree. He earned several Master's degrees in theology and divinity from Gordon–Conwell Theological Seminary, Princeton Theological Seminary, and the University of Toronto. He later earned a Doctor of Philosophy from the University of Oxford.

Academic career
Gibson taught preaching at Gordon–Conwell from 1991 until 2018 when he joined Baylor’s George W. Truett Theological Seminary as the holder of the David E. Garland Chair of Preaching and Director of the Ph.D. Program in Preaching.

Gibson was co-founder, with Keith Willhite of Dallas Seminary, of the Evangelical Homiletics Society (EHS), in 1997. He has served as founding editor of the peer-reviewed journal, The Journal of the Evangelical Homiletics Society since 2000.

In 2018 Dr. Gibson was honored with a Festschrift edited by Matthew D. Kim, No Program but Time, No Book but the Bible: Reflections on Mentoring and Discipleship in Honor of Scott M. Gibson (Eugene: Wipf and Stock). .

Personal life 
Gibson married Rhonda Lynn Aiken (b. 1965) of New Castle, Pennsylvania, on 15 December 2000.

Ministry 
Gibson has pastored churches in Pennsylvania, New York, and Massachusetts.

Writings 
 Gibson, Scott M.; Willhite, Keith, eds. (1998). The Big Idea of Biblical Preaching: Connecting the Bible to People. Grand Rapids: Baker. .  
 Gibson, Scott M., ed. (1999). Making a Difference in Preaching: Haddon Robinson on Biblical Preaching. Grand Rapids: Baker. . 
 Gibson, Scott M. (2001). A.J. Gordon: American Premillennialist. Lanham, MD: University Press of America. . 
 __. (2001). Preaching for Special Services. Grand Rapids: Baker. . 
 __., ed. (2004). Preaching to a Shifting Culture: 12 Perspectives on Preaching that Connects. Grand Rapids: Baker. .
 __., ed. (2005). Contemporary Baptists and Historic Faith. Westminster, CA: Principle Press. .
 __., ed. (2006). Preaching the Old Testament. Grand Rapids: Baker. .
 __. (2008). Should We Use Someone Else’s Sermon? Preaching in a Cut and Paste World. Grand Rapids: Zondervan. .
 __., ed. (2010). and introduction to, How Christ Came to Church: The Pastor’s Dream, A Spiritual Autobiography by A.J. Gordon. Grand Rapids: Kregel. .
 __., (2012). Preaching with a Plan: Sermon Strategies for Growing Mature Believers. Grand Rapids: Baker. .
 __., ed. (2016). Preaching Points: 55 Tips for Improving Your Pulpit Ministry. Wooster: Weaver. Now: Bellingham: Lexham Press. .
 __., ed. (2018). The Worlds of the Preacher: Navigating Biblical, Cultural, and Personal Contexts. Grand Rapids: Baker. .
 Gibson, Scott M. and Kim, Matthew D., eds. (2018). Homiletics and Hermeneutics: Four Views of Preaching Today. Grand Rapids: Baker. Co-editor and author of chapters. .
 Gibson, Scott M., ed. (2019). Training Preachers: A Guide to Teaching Homiletics. Bellingham: Lexham. Editor and author of chapters. .
 Gibson, Scott M. and Mason, Karen. (2020). Preaching Hope in Darkness: Addressing Suicide from the Pulpit. Bellingham: Lexham. .
 Gibson, Scott M. and Still, Todd D., eds. (2020). With Radiant Hope: Timely and Timeless Reflections from George W. Truett. Waco: Big Bear Books/Baylor University Press. .
 Gibson, Scott M.  and Kim, Matthew D., eds. (2021). The Big Idea Companion for Preaching and Teaching. Grand Rapids: Baker. .

References

1957 births
Living people
Gordon–Conwell Theological Seminary alumni
People from New Castle, Pennsylvania
Alumni of the University of Oxford
Princeton Theological Seminary alumni
Pennsylvania State University alumni
University of Toronto alumni
American expatriates in the United Kingdom
American expatriates in Canada
Gordon–Conwell Theological Seminary faculty